Schwarme is a municipality in the district of Diepholz, in Lower Saxony, Germany. The municipality Schwarme is located in the Mittelweserregion around 30 km south of Bremen. The towns Achim, Verden and Bruchhausen-Vilsen are about 15 km from Schwarme.

References

Diepholz (district)